Rocky Point is a settlement in Prince Edward Island. It is part of Lot 65 in Hillsboro Parish. Rocky Point had been the location of an annual Mi'kmaq summer coastal community prior to European settlement.

Port-la-Joye–Fort Amherst,  a National Historic Site, is located within the settlement.

Sources

Communities in Queens County, Prince Edward Island